The National Research Council of Canada is a major federal research institution in Canada, founded in 1916 as the Honorary Advisory Council for Scientific and Industrial Research. Originally a loose federation of scientific experts advising the government, it was given an executive body in 1928 (when the first President was appointed) and received funds to establish a laboratory in the same year, which opened in 1932.

Presidents

References

Presidents
National Research Council (Canada)